Ploss or Ploß is a surname. Notable people with the surname include:

 Christoph Ploß (born 1985), German politician
 Hermann Heinrich Ploss (1819–1885), German gynecologist and anthropologist

German-language surnames
Surnames from nicknames